Dysmachus is a genus of flies belonging to the family Asilidae.

The species of this genus are found in Europe.

Some species

Species:

Dysmachus albiseta 
Dysmachus albisetosus 
Dysmachus albovestitus 
Dysmachus trigonus

References

Asilidae